The Women's team pursuit at the European Track Championships was first competed in 2010 in Poland. Originally raced by three riders over 3000 metres, in 2013 it became a four rider, 4000 metre event identical to the men's equivalent.

The Team pursuit competition at the European championships consists of a qualifying round raced as a time trial, followed by a final between the two fastest teams and the race for the bronze medal between the teams in 3rd and 4th place after qualification.

The most successful country in the event has been Great Britain with eight of the eleven titles won by the British teams. Laura Trott is the most successful rider in the event, being the only ever present in the eight British wins (2010, 2011, 2013, 2014, 2015, 2018, 2019 and 2020). Trott was an absentee from all three British teams that failed to win the title in 2016, 2017 and 2021/.

Medalists

References

2010 Results
2011 Results
2012 Results

 
Women's team pursuit
Women's team pursuit (track cycling)